is the debut single by Japanese singer Hiroko Moriguchi, released on August 7, 1985 under Starchild Records. The song was written by Neil Sedaka and Masao Urino, based on Sedaka's unreleased song "For Us to Decide". It is best known as the second opening theme of the 1985 mecha anime series Mobile Suit Zeta Gundam. The single peaked at No. 16 on Oricon's singles charts, making it Moriguchi's biggest single at the time until "Eternal Wind" charted at No. 9 in 1991.

In 2018, the song was ranked No. 1 on NHK's . Moriguchi re-recorded the song for the 2019 album Gundam Song Covers. "Gin'iro Dress", the B-side, was ranked No. 2 on a 2020 poll hosted by King Records and was re-recorded by Moriguchi for the album Gundam Song Covers 2. An a cappella version of "Mizu no Hoshi e Ai wo Komete" was recorded for her 2021 album Aoi Inochi featuring 35 tracks of her voice. Moriguchi recorded another version of the song as part of the "Mobile Suit Zeta Gundam Medley" (alongside Mami Ayukawa's "Zeta - Toki wo Koete") on her 2022 album Gundam Song Covers 3.

Track listing
All music is arranged by Kōji Makaino.

Chart position

Cover versions 
 Hiroshi Kumagai covered the song on the 1999 live album Mobile Suit Gundam Concert Special Live.
 Ikurō Fujiwara covered the song on the 2002 compilation album Eternal Love: Animation Healing Music 1.
 Yoko Ishida covered the song on the 2003 compilation album Best Max: The Power of New Animation Songs.
 Richie Kotzen recorded an English-language cover of the song titled "Blue Star" on his 2006 cover album Ai Senshi Z×R.
 Mikuni Shimokawa covered the song on her 2007 compilation Reprise: Shimokawa Mikuni Anison Best.
 MIQ covered the song on the 2007 compilation album The Best!! Super Robot Spirits -Girls Best Collection-.
 Chihiro Yonekura covered the song on her 2008 cover album Ever After.
 Yuko Suzuhana covered the song on her 2016 solo debut album Cradle of Eternity.
 Russian group Max Lux covered the song on their 2016 cover album Suna no Kajitsu: Fujiyama Paradise Tribute.
 Sugizo feat. KOM_I (Wednesday Campanella) covered the song as the second ending theme of the 2019 TV series Mobile Suit Gundam: The Origin - Advent of the Red Comet.

References

External links 
 
 
 

1985 debut singles
1985 songs
Hiroko Moriguchi songs
Gundam songs
Japanese-language songs
Songs with lyrics by Masao Urino
Songs written by Neil Sedaka
King Records (Japan) singles